Akçatepe may refer to:

People
 Halit Akçatepe (born 1938), Turkish actor
 Sitki Akçatepe (1902–1985), Turkish actor

Places
 Akçatepe, Keban
 Akçatepe, Tut, a village in the district of Tut, Adıyaman Province, Turkey

Turkish-language surnames